The 1927 Ice Hockey European Championship was the 12th edition of the ice hockey tournament for European countries associated to the International Ice Hockey Federation .  
 
The tournament was played between January 24, and January 29, 1927, in Vienna, Austria, and it was won by Austria.

Results

January 24

January 25

January 26

January 27

January 28

January 29

Final standings

Top Goalscorer

Wilhelm Kreitz (Belgium), 7 goals

References
  Euro Championship 1927

1926–27 in Austrian ice hockey
1927
Ice Hockey European Championships
January 1927 sports events
Sports competitions in Vienna
1920s in Vienna